Pycnarmon tapeina is a moth in the family Crambidae. It was described by Jean Ghesquière in 1940. It is found in the area of the former province Équateur in the Democratic Republic of the Congo.

References

Spilomelinae
Moths described in 1940
Moths of Africa